This is a list of the main characters from The Mortal Instruments series by Cassandra Clare, including the novels City of Bones, City of Ashes, City of Glass, City of Fallen Angels, City of Lost Souls, and City of Heavenly Fire. The series is part of a bigger media franchise, The Shadowhunter Chronicles. The series was adapted into a film, The Mortal Instruments: City of Bones, and a television series, Shadowhunters.

Television series cast
The following is a list of Shadowhunters television series regulars who have appeared in one or more of the series' three seasons. The characters are listed in the order they were first credited in the series.

Key
  = Main cast (actor receives "Starring" credit that season) 
  = Recurring cast (actor appears in two or more episodes that season)
  = Guest cast (actor appears in only one episode that season)

Main characters

Clary Fairchild

Clarissa Adele "Clary" Fairchild is a fictional character and the main protagonist of The Mortal Instruments series.

While at a New York City nightclub, the Pandemonium, she is stunned to observe a group of teenagers stalk and attack a supposed 'human' and tries to stop them. She learns their names are Jace, Alec and Isabelle. They reveal that the man was truly a demon and hint themselves to be a part of a Supernatural community called the 'Shadowhunters'. She thinks that they are all mad at first but stalls when she sees when the 'human' the Shadowhunters were stalking suddenly grows claws and strange eyes and disappears when killed. She had called the security of the place before, and when they come, she soon realizes that she is the only person able to see them.

After the battle, Clary is introduced to the group of teens, who identify themselves as Shadowhunters, a race of humans who are physically enhanced with angel blood and secretly protect humanity from demons. When her mother Jocelyn goes missing, Clary learns that the event is connected to the conflict between the Shadowhunters and their enemies. She then enters the Shadowhunter fold and there she finds that she also is a Shadowhunter. Her mother had paid the warlock Magnus Bane to put a block in her head so she could not remember parts of the Shadow World even moments after she sees it. She and the group of Shadowhunters try to find hints to find her mother. In the process, she falls in love with fellow Shadowhunter Jace Wayland.

Clary learns that Valentine Morgenstern, who is supposed to be long dead but truly is not, the main antagonist of the series, is her biological father and her mother's husband. At the end of City of Bones, Valentine tells them that Clary and Jace are siblings — which, as they discover later in the series, is a lie. In the second book of the series, City of Ashes, Clary dates her best friend Simon, who has for a long time had a crush on her, to forget Jace during the torturous time of believing him to be her brother. She is told by the Seelie Queen that she and Jace are Valentine's experiments but mysteriously does not explain further. She finds out later that she was exposed to powdered angel blood through her mother who consumed it unknowingly while she was pregnant with Clary. This angelic blood granted her the ability to create runes that do not exist and amplify the power of existing runes for herself. At the end of the second novel, Clary finds that an old friend of her mother, Madeleine, knows how to wake her mother, who has been in a magical coma since the first book.

In City of Glass, it is discovered that Jocelyn had taken a potion, made by a warlock named Ragnor Fell, to induce a comatose state and prevent her from being interrogated by Valentine. Before she dies, Madeleine tells Clary she needs to find Fell, who will help her cure her mother. Clary, using her power to create runes, creates a rune with the ability to create a Portal a magic and conveys herself and Luke to Idris, and falls into Lake Lyn and drinks some of the water by accident; this causes her to hallucinate because the lake's water is poisonous to Shadowhunters. Luke then takes her to his sister Amatis for healing.

During her stay in Alicante, Clary ventures to find Ragnor Fell, who will be able to help her with the potion. She is escorted there by Sebastian Verlac, whom she recently met, in an attempt to make contact with Fell. Instead, she finds Magnus Bane. He tells her of Ragnor's death and how he was called as a replacement and requests that she find him the Book of White in return for his help. She returns to Alicante, where Sebastian kisses her. She rejects him after having feelings of "wrong" while he kissed her, and they continue back to Alicante. She then learns that something called the Book of White has been hidden in Wayland Manor, and travels with Jace to retrieve it. Inside the Manor, they find the angel Ithuriel tied up and left for dead in the basement. He gives both Shadowhunters visions of Valentine experimenting on his children with the demon and his angel blood in an attempt to make a stronger warrior.

They escape from Wayland Manor, after freeing Ithuriel so that he can finally die; the two then share a moment of passionate romance. They return to Alicante to see it burning from the first assault on the city, and after things are in order, Clary meets with the others and they go to free Simon who was taken to a Conclave prison called The Guard. They return to see the Clave, and Clary uses her rune ability to create a binding rune, enabling Shadowhunters and Downworlders to share powers. All those of age go to the battle on Brocelind Plains, and Clary has to give Simon the Mark of Cain so that the vampires will join the fight.

At last, Magnus wakes Clary's mother Jocelyn, who informs Clary that Jace is her brother. Her real brother is Jonathan Morgenstern, who has, this whole time, pretended to be Sebastian. It is soon revealed that Sebastian is a spy for Valentine and that he tried to seduce Clary into teaming up with him. Clary then tries to locate Jace to help him. She runs into Valentine, who ties her down in order to complete his summoning of the Angel Raziel by using her blood. Then, when Jace arrives to rescue her, Valentine forces her to watch as he fatally stabs Jace in the chest. Upon summoning the angel, Clary changes the marks on Valentine's summoning circle, giving her the ability to control the Angel, and after Valentine is slain, wishes to have Jace back. After Jace is brought back to life, the two get together.

In the fourth book, City of Fallen Angels, Clary and Jace are happily in love. But soon, Jace starts to behave strangely and avoids her, leading Clary to assume he wants to break up with her. In truth, he has been influenced by Lilith, mother of all demons and former wife of Adam before Eve, who sent him dreams in which he kills or hurts Clary, because when he was raised from the dead by Raziel, all of his protections placed on him at birth were stripped away, leaving him vulnerable to demonic influence. During the party, when Lucian's pack celebrated his engagement with Clary's mother Jocelyn, she is kidnapped by a fully possessed Jace and taken to Lilith. There, she learns her brother Jonathan Christopher Morgenstern/Sebastian Verlac is going to be raised from the dead by Simon, who is blackmailed by Lilith for the life of Clary, and she was brought just to make him do that. Using Jace's affection for her (which remains undiminished because his possession has no effect on that part of him), she cuts the rune which enabled Lilith to control him. Jace and Lilith fight fiercely until Lilith stops him by torturing Clary. Seeing his chance, Simon comes in the way of Lilith's blow to Clary, the Mark of Cain possessed by him returns the blow sevenfold to Lilith, destroying her. After Lilith's destruction, Isabelle and Alec appear on the scene, but Jace shoos them away since he doesn't want to be consoled as he feels terrible for hurting Clary, in spite of the fact that he wasn't himself. Alec then shoves Clary back to the room as they get into the elevator, feeling that only she can help him. Clary and Jace reaffirm their love after she convinces him he is not a horrible person. The last words Clary says to him before going down are, "I'll be back. Five minutes," and they share a kiss before she leaves and comes back to find him gone, unaware his rune has healed and he is possessed once again.

In the fifth book of the series, City of Lost Souls, Clary has realized that Jace has gone away with Sebastian Morgenstern. The Clave was alarmed by the sudden disappearance of Sebastian and Jace and started to search for any signs of them, after two weeks of repeating the same statement about what happened at the rooftop, before Clary left him with Sebastian, alive by Simon's blood. But other problems come to the Clave and it has to set aside the search for Jonathan. Clary is outraged by the news. Using the bell given to her by Kaelie Whitewillow, a waitress and subject of the Queen's, she goes to the Seelie Queen's palace where she has to beg for help due to the limited resources. The Seelie Queen has requested that Clary is allowed to steal the faerie rings kept inside the institute. Clary steals the rings but doesn't give them to the Queen because of the appearance of Jace and Sebastian at the library, all healthy looking and safe. Afterwards, Clary accepts their offer of coming to them.

When the plan of Sebastian was finally revealed to her, she couldn't believe what could happen. When Sebastian finds her communicating with Simon through the Faerie rings, he fights her and attempts to rape her. At the enchantment ceremony, she was surprised when Amatis was turned into a dark Shadowhunter by the blood of Lilith. At the same time, Magnus, Alec, Maryse, Isabelle, and Simon arrived, with Glorious in hand. When Glorious was handed to her, she struck Jace, the mark of Lilith burning, making him cry out in pain.

In the epilogue, she was concerned why she couldn't visit Jace because of her thoughts telling her she almost killed Jace, but reassured by Isabelle she didn't do anything to make Jace mad. She visited Jace, but she almost thought she wasn't going to be allowed to go in due to Brother Zachariah. By the consent of Brother Zachariah, she entered, hugging Jace and reaffirming their relationship.

Finally in City of Heavenly Fire, Sebastian has taken many shadowhunters and turned them into his Endarkened. The remaining shadowhunters retreat to Idris for safety. Sebastian offers to leave them alone if he is given Clary and Jace. Before the Clave can make a decision Clary, Jace, Simon, Isabelle and Alec sneak off to Edom, the demon realm Sebastian is hiding in; he has Jocelyn, Luke, Magnus and Raphael prisoner. After spending days trying to find him they come upon his castle, a dark version of Alicante. Sebastian offers Clary a place next to him, in exchange for leaving everyone she knows and all of the Shadowhunters alone. She accepts it, knowing that she has to keep everyone safe. When Sebastian is momentarily distracted she stabs him with the Morgenstern blade, containing Heavenly Fire. He is returned to the brother that she could have had before he then dies.

The group manage to escape after Simon gives up his immortality and memories of the Shadow World to Magnus Banes's father, Asmodeus. Months later Clary talks to him but he doesn't remember her. At her mother and Luke's wedding, Simon tells her he remembers her. She and Jace are happy, as the others; they are coping with all the losses of the dark war. After all that Jace finally finds out what Sebastian did to Clary.

Physical appearance
Clary is 5'2" with curly red hair, green eyes, pale skin, and freckles. She is said to look like her mother, who is described as beautiful and small. Clary sometimes doubts the fact that she is as beautiful as her mother, believing herself to be a duller version of her mother, with less defined features. She is rather small and thin. She is described by Jace many times throughout the series as "delicate".

She is portrayed by Lily Collins in the film adaptation of the book and Katherine McNamara in the television series.

Family
She is the daughter of Valentine Morgenstern and Jocelyn Fairchild, stepdaughter of Lucian Graymark. She is also the sister to Jonathan Christopher 'Sebastian' Morgenstern.

She gained her ability to create runes when Valentine fed her mother angel blood while she was in the womb.

Appearances in books
City of Bones (2007)
City of Ashes (2008)
City of Glass (2009)
City of Fallen Angels (2011)
City of Lost Souls (2012)
City of Heavenly Fire (2014)
Tales from the Shadowhunter Academy (2015)
Lady Midnight (2016)
Lord of Shadows (2017)
Queen of Air and Darkness (2018)
Lost Book of White

Jace Herondale 

Jonathan Christopher "Jace" Herondale is a Shadowhunter living at the New York Institute with his adopted family, the Lightwoods. Jace's legal name changes throughout the series, from Jace Wayland (when his father is thought to be Michael Wayland), to Jonathan Morgenstern (when thought to be Valentine's son), to Jace Lightwood for the family that has taken him in, to Jace Herondale (when his true father is revealed to be Stephen Herondale). His mother was the young Céline Herondale, a member of Valentine's inner circle with Stephen Herondale, his father. Jace did not like being called Jonathan. He was either Jace Herondale or Jace Lightwood.

The nickname "Jace" was given to him by Maryse Lightwood after his (fake) initials J.C. (Jonathan Christopher, because no one but Valentine and Jocelyn knew Jace was not his real son), when he first began living with Maryse Lightwood and her family, because of his dislike for his name. Jace was given the blood of an angel named Ithuriel by Valentine when Celiné was pregnant with him. This gave him enhanced abilities, even compared to regular Shadowhunters, such as enhanced durability, enhanced speed, and enhanced stealth.

For most of the books, Jace's sarcastic, cold remarks and behavior hide his tortured and angry soul. In City of Ashes, his strong "bad-boy" personality makes Maryse Lightwood (his adoptive mother) somewhat scared of him, realising his alikeness to Valentine, who was believed to be his real father until the assumption was proven false in City of Glass. Jace and Clary fall in love in City of Bones, making Clary the only girl Jace has developed real genuine feelings for, but after they find out they are "siblings", each attempts to get over the other by dating other people. He is naturally overprotective and caring for her, although Clary does not see this due to her internal suffering. At the end of the third novel, City of Glass, Jocelyn contradicts Valentine's avowal that Jace and Clary are siblings, telling Clary that Jace is actually the son of Celine and Stephen Herondale. The truth frees Jace and Clary from the torture of having seemingly incestuous feelings for each other, allowing them to accept their mutual feelings and become a "real" couple.

By Lady Midnight, the first book in the third series (The Dark Artifices) of Shadowhunters, Jace has proposed to Clary. They are 23 and 24 respectively. However, she refuses him, because she believes that she is going to die (she has been having visions of her lying dead, and Jace is crying over her dead body).
Clary admits to Emma at the beginning of the second book, Lord of Shadows, that Jace has, in fact, proposed to her, but she is afraid that she will die, leaving Jace without his love/ wife. Since she considers marriage as a promise of staying, she refuses his proposal in order to focus on their mission.
By Queen of Air And Darkness, however, we discover that she had, in fact, been having visions of Thule, where Jace is Endarkened and Clary is dead.
Clary proposes to Jace, and he agrees.
We see the chapter end on them kissing, and the Midnight Flower opens in front of them, unnoticed.

 Physical appearance

Jace has wavy dark golden-blond hair and dark golden eyes. He has a slim, muscular build, and is about 5'11". His face is described as being pretty and angular, and Clary often refers to him as beautiful and leonine, with a narrow mouth. His eyes were much lighter in City of Bones, City of Ashes, and City of Glass; Clary describes his eyes and hair as darker in City of Fallen Angels. His eyes are brown with flecks of gold that lighten and darken with his moods. In The Bane Chronicles; Magnus describes Jace as being the gold to Alec's silver.

Like all other Shadowhunters, he is covered in thin, pale scars from years of applying various magical runes with a stele for battle and healing purposes. It is said that Jace is seventeen years old, though that was assuming he was Valentine (or Michael Wayland's) son, and his real age is between a few years younger than Jonathan Christopher and a year or so older than Clary. Jace is also left-handed (like Valentine). He has often said (and tried to prove) that the only trait he got from his father was his attitude. He is described to be extremely good looking. Jace is portrayed by Jamie Campbell Bower in the film adaptation of the book and Dominic Sherwood in the television series.

 Family
In City of Bones, Jace lives with his adoptive family, the Lightwoods, and is seen as the brother of the Lightwood children. Later, he is told that he is the son of Valentine and Jocelyn Morgenstern, and not Michael Wayland as he had been told. At this time, he is also told that Clary Fray is his sister.

In the end, it is revealed that he is actually Stephen Herondale and Celine Herondale's son and that Clary is not related to him. He and Clary have a conversation at the end of City of Glass in which he confesses that he doesn't know who he is, referring to his last name. Clary confirms that he is a Lightwood, and Jace accepts that, correcting people throughout City of Fallen Angels when they referred to him as "Jace Herondale". At the end of City of Heavenly Fire, Jace chooses to take on the Herondale name. Jace is also related to Will Herondale former leader of the London Institute and husband of Warlock Tessa Grey.

 Jace's romantic interests
Clary Fray: Jace begins to fall in love with Clary Fray in City of Bones, growing close to her. Isabelle and Alec later say that they noticed a change in Jace's behavior after he started getting close to Clary. In City of Glass, Isabelle tells Clary that before Jace met her, he was apathetic and only half-alive as if in a long-time sleep, but that after his first encounter with her, Jace "woke up" and "started living". Isabelle further claims that she has never seen him act the way he does with Clary and states that Jace will never get over her. Throughout the series, Jace continuously loves Clary even after he believes they are siblings, to the extent that he is willing to commit incest with her and have a secret relationship. He has been with a couple of girls (though it being stated as more as just hooking up) and tries to start a relationship with Aline Penhallow in a failed attempt to get over Clary. Clary and Jace reunite at the end of the third book after discovering they are not siblings.

By Lady Midnight, the first book in the third series (The Dark Artifices) of Shadowhunters, Jace has proposed to Clary. They are 23 and 24 respectively. However, she refuses him, because she believes that she is going to die (she has been having visions of her lying dead, and Jace is crying over her dead body). Clary admits to Emma at the beginning of the second book, Lord of Shadows, that Jace has, in fact, proposed to her, but she is afraid that she will die, leaving Jace without his love/wife. By Queen of Air And Darkness, however, we discover that she had, in fact, been having visions of Thule, where Jace is Endarkened and Clary is dead. Clary proposes to Jace, and he agrees. We see the chapter end on them kissing, and the Midnight Flower opens in front of them, unnoticed.

Appearances in books 
City of Bones
City of Ashes
City of Glass
City of Fallen Angels
City of Lost Souls
City of Heavenly Fire
Tales from the Shadowhunter Academy
The Bane Chronicles (mentioned)
Lady Midnight
A History of Notable Shadowhunters & Denizens of the Downworld
Queen of Air and Darkness (2018)
Lost Book of White

Simon Lewis

Simon Lewis is Clary's best friend. He accompanies Clary in her adventures, despite being human for the first book and most of the second book. Simon eventually becomes a Shadowhunter and he and Clary become Parabatai. Along the way Simon falls for Isabelle Lightwood and he proposes to her and she says yes. 
He is portrayed by Robert Sheehan in the film and by Alberto Rosende in the television series.

Family
His family is said to be devoutly Jewish. Not much is said about Simon's family. It is mentioned that his father died when he was very young due to a heart attack. His mother, Elaine Lewis, becomes a more prominent character in City of Fallen Angels when she discovers that Simon is a vampire and kicks him out of the house. Upon leaving, he puts her in a trance, hoping to talk to her at a later date. He also has a sister named Rebecca who is a few years older than he is. In City of Lost Souls, he admits to his sister that he is a vampire despite his fear of her shutting him out like his mother. Rebecca accepts him, and the two stay in contact.

Elaine Lewis is portrayed by Christina Cox, and Rebecca is portrayed by Holly Deveaux in the television series.

Character development
In City of Bones, he is kidnapped by vampires after being turned into a rat and brought to their lair in the abandoned Hotel Dumort. Later, in City of Ashes, he begins to feel some side effects as a result of biting Raphael, the temporary head vampire while he was a rat. Because he is human and doesn't know the correct way to become a vampire, he begins to fear that he may be turning into a monster.

When he cannot reconcile his feelings for Clary, he returns to the hotel—putting himself in great danger—to ask them if he is becoming one of them. Unfortunately, the vampires attack, and Raphael saves him from immediate death by bringing him back to the institute, where Clary is staying. Faced with the choice of letting Simon die or making him a vampire, Clary and Jace decide to let him be reborn as a vampire. In City of Ashes, he becomes a "Daylighter" after being drained of most of his blood on Valentine's ship by Valentine so he can complete his Conversion on Maellartach, The Soul-Sword. Jace finds Simon on the brink of death and allows him to drink his blood to revive him. The large quantity of Angel blood in Jace's body then allows Simon to stand in high sun with no risk of burning, unlike all other vampires who cannot.
 
After Max Lightwood's death, Isabelle (Max's older sister) becomes distraught, blaming herself for not listening to him and for not being there for her little brother. She refused to see anyone, finally allowing Simon to come in. Simon comforts Isabelle, trying to convince her that Max's death wasn't her fault, and ends up sleeping next to her, much to his surprise, although they do nothing sexual. Towards the end of the third novel, Raphael demands Simon's death in exchange for his clan's assistance for the war; Raphael believes Simon's Daylighter powers make him too dangerous to remain alive. In order to protect him, Clary draws the Mark of Cain on Simon, which prevents him from being harmed by anyone and also curses him, marking him as a wanderer for eternity.

In City of Fallen Angels, a conflicted Simon tries casually dating both Isabelle and Maia. When the girls find out, they both leave him, and he is alone once more. However, by the end of the book it is clear that a deepening relationship is forming between Simon and Isabelle.

In City of Lost Souls, Simon loses his Mark of Cain to the Angel Raziel in exchange for the sword "Glorious" to save Jace by separating him and Sebastian. Throughout the book, Simon and Isabelle's relationship progresses to the point where she trusts him enough to let him bite her when he is hungry. They spend nights together, much to Alec's horror. However, they still don't consider themselves dating for neither has confessed that they want to. Simon thinks he will just be dumped like the rest of Isabelle's boyfriends while Isabelle has trouble revealing her feelings and thinks Simon should make the first move.

In City of Heavenly Fire, Simon admits his love to Isabelle. Throughout the book, Simon follows Clary and Jace—along with Isabelle and Alec—into the demon realm Edom to defeat Sebastian and find Magnus, Raphael, Luke and Jocelyn. In the demon realm, he saves Isabelle after she is bitten by a demon. Soon after, he tells Isabelle he loves her. As a result, they finally make their relationship official. At the end, after defeating Sebastian, they have no possible way of getting out. Magnus calls on his father, Asmodeus, who asks to help them get out of Edom since Sebastian closed all possible ways for them to get out. In return, Asmodeus wants Magnus' immortal life – if Magnus does this, he will die. None of them want Magnus to sacrifice his life, so Simon steps forward. Because Simon has only just become a vampire, his years will not catch up to him and he will return a mundane. But to spice up the deal, Asmodeus also says he must take away all of Simon's memory of the Shadow world and of Clary. Everything he will remember will be a normal life, a life without Clary, or Jace, or Alec, or Magnus and Isabelle. This devastated them all, but Simon gave it willingly to save his friends and the person he loves. In the Epilogue, Clary tries to see if Simon remembers her, but he doesn't and just thinks she's a crazy girl with tattoos. Except, he does give her his band flyer thinking she might be hitting on him. She walks away with it. Clary gives Izzy the flyer and walks away. The flyer says the band's name, "The Mortal Instruments". With this sliver of hope, Izzy and Magnus go to Simon and tell him what has happened. Simon is given the choice for Magnus to prep him to Ascend and become a Shadowhunter so that Asmodeus cannot touch him and he can regain all of his memory. Simon agrees and receives some of his memory back. He then reunites with Clary, Izzy, and the rest of the clan at Jocelyn and Luke's wedding. In Tales From the Shadowhunter Academy, Simon trains as a shadowhunter and becomes Clary's parabatai.

Love interests 
Clary Fray
Maia Roberts
Isabelle Lightwood

Appearances in books 
City of Bones
City of Ashes
City of Glass
City of Fallen Angels
City of Lost Souls
City of Heavenly Fire
Tales from the Shadowhunter Academy
A History of Notable Shadowhunters & Denizens of the Downworld
Lost Book of White

Luke Garroway

Luke Garroway (birth name Lucian Graymark) is Jocelyn Fray's best friend who later becomes her husband and step-father to Clary Fray. He is a werewolf who was a Shadowhunter and member of the Circle which was run by Valentine Morgenstern.

In his early life, Lucian was raised in Idris with his mother and older sister Amatis. Later, his mother left to join the Iron Sisters, leaving Luke to be raised by his sister. When Luke was young, he met Jocelyn Fairchild (Jocelyn Fray) and they were later sent to Alicante to train and attend school. When they arrived at Alicante, Luke wasn't the best in school and often contemplated quitting, until Valentine Morgenstern offered to tutor him.

Lycanthropy
Before Luke turned into a Werewolf, he was a Shadowhunter, Valentine had invited Luke to go hunting to help clean out the werewolves' nests that had killed Valentine's father, while they were scouting out the nests, a werewolf bit Luke. After he was bitten, Luke wasn't sure if the bite was enough to infect him with Lycanthropy. At one point, he went seeking aid from his sister Amatis for help and shelter and was sent away. He, along with Jocelyn and Valentine had kept quiet in following weeks while they awaited for the full moon. To his dismay, he did Change after the attack. Valentine then took him to the forest and gave Luke his father's dagger and told him to be honorable and kill himself. Valentine then led everyone to believe that Luke was dead.

Instead Luke sought out the werewolf that had turned him to kill him and himself in the process. When Luke finally found him, he turned out to be the leader of a pack in Brocelind Forest. Luke had fought and killed him. By werewolf law, Luke had become the new pack leader, and accepted the position and began his new life.

Physical appearance
Luke has blue eyes and brown, uneven hair with ragged-looking clothes. He is tall, with squared shoulders and wears glasses. His favorite shirts to wear are flannel shirts. He is portrayed by Aidan Turner in the film adaptation of the book, and Isaiah Mustafa in the television series.

Luke's Love Interests 
Jocelyn Fray (Fairchild) was Luke's main love interest throughout The Mortal Instruments series. Luke has known Jocelyn since they were kids and had developed feelings for her but never acted on it because Jocelyn loved Valentine at the time. After Jocelyn and Valentine were married, his friendship with Jocelyn continued but after Valentine's darkness became evident, Jocelyn would only confide in him. When he was turned into a werewolf and was believed to be dead, she searched for him believing that he was still alive.

After the Uprising Luke had offered Jocelyn to marry him but she refused and when they parted ways Luke couldn't forget her and went looking for her. When he finally found her in New York, he chose to leave his life as a Werewolf behind to live a mundane life, all whilst harbouring a deep love for her.

Even though it took Luke many years, he finally told Jocelyn how he feels after she awoke from her coma. A few weeks later, the two became engaged and were married after the Dark War.

Appearances in books 
City of Bones
City of Ashes
City of Glass
City of Fallen Angels
City of Lost Souls
City of Heavenly Fire
A History of Notable Shadowhunters & Denizens of the Downworld

Isabelle Lightwood
Isabelle Sophia "Izzy" Lightwood is a Shadowhunter and lives in the New York Institute. She was born on May 31, is the younger sister of Alec and Jace and is older than Max. Passionate and with a high sense of fashion. She is rebellious and very beautiful. Her cooking is often made fun of by Jace and Alec. She is known to be dangerous and often carries weapons in her tall boots that are never less than seven inches.

Her signature weapon is an electrum whip with which she is quite skilled. She dresses well, as shown when she gave Clary to wear clothes that she picked for Magnus's party. She is shown to take responsibility for situations, shouldering the blame for her brother Max's death, despite having been struck unconscious at the time. She is comforted by Simon, and ends up sleeping (in a literal, non-sexual sense) with him. She begins to casually date Simon—who is also dating Maia at the same time—and then later upon finding out about Maia, breaks up with him. After this and seeing how she is genuinely hurt by it, begins to slowly realize that she may actually be in love with Simon, but refuses to admit it.

Izzy obviously cares for Jace and Alec, and is fiercely protective of both of them. Because of this, she is constantly torn over the fact that her brother is struggling with his sexuality and when Jace is heartbroken over Clary during their supposedly sibling relationship. In City of Glass, she yells at Clary for only thinking of herself and not realizing how much pain Jace is in due to how much he really loves her.

Physical appearance
Isabelle is very beautiful and tall. She has very dark brown eyes with hints of gold that initially appear to be black. She is curvaceous and has long black hair that is described as "black as spilt ink" by Clary. She dresses stylishly, often with high heels. However, she despised her height and hated towering over everyone and wished to be small and delicate like Clary.

She is portrayed by Jemima West in the film adaptation of the book, and Emeraude Toubia in the television series.

Family
Isabelle is the middle child in the Lightwood family. Her parents are Maryse and Robert Lightwood, who were once in the Circle with Valentine until the Uprising. Her older brother is Alec and her younger brother was Max, who died at the hand of Jonathan Christopher Morgenstern. Jace is her adoptive brother. Her parents run the Institute in New York.

Isabelle's love interests 
Simon Lewis: Simon is obviously smitten with her when they first meet, but she never treats him as anything more than a "mundane" until after his transformation into vampirism. As a vampire, he gets deeper into their world and they become friends. They spend the night together (non-sexually) when Simon attempts to comfort Isabelle after Max's death which she blamed herself for. Isabelle is shown to be jealous of Maia, who also liked Simon. Isabelle's feelings for Simon deepen later into the series, though she refuses to admit that she may be in love with him. In City of Lost Souls, she eventually admits that she thinks about Simon all the time and "nothing like this has ever happened to [her] before". However, she struggles with her feelings and telling Simon how she feels about him, believing that the guy should make the first move (contradicting with Simon's personality who, as stated by Clary, thinks that if a girl does nothing to indicate any romantic feelings must mean that she doesn't like him).
Meliorn: Meliorn is a knight of the Seelie Court and later the Seelie representative on the council. In City of Heavenly Fire, he is found out to be half-human half-faerie and is killed by Alec. He and Isabelle had a brief fling and the Seelie Queen hearing about this had him pass on a message to request an audience with Clary, Isabelle, Jace, Alec and Simon.

Appearances in books 
City of Bones
City of Ashes
City of Glass
City of Fallen Angels
City of Lost Souls
City of Heavenly Fire
Tales from the Shadowhunter Academy
A History of Notable Shadowhunters & Denizens of the Downworld
Lost Book of White

Alec Lightwood
Alexander "Alec" Gideon Lightwood was born on August 24; he is the son of Robert and Maryse Lightwood, and brother of Isabelle (Izzy) Lightwood & Max Lightwood; shares a vincule with his adopted brother Jace Herondale who is his Parabatai. Lives in the New York Institute with his siblings. He is the oldest of the Lightwoods and is quieter than both Isabelle, his brother Max, and Jace, his best friend and adoptive brother. Alec is 18, making him legally an 'adult,' which gives him permission to attend Clave meetings. He was jealous of Clary, at first, upon meeting her due to knowing how Jace felt about her, and Alec himself had a crush on Jace. Later, he begins to forget him and he starts to date and falls desperately in love with Magnus Bane (a warlock who is immortal and nearly 400 years old), though his strong brotherly love for Jace remains.

Alec is mostly soft-spoken and serious. He tries his best to act wisely and is not as reckless as Jace. Later in the story, it is revealed early on that he had never killed a demon, which changes in the middle of City of Bones. He shows himself to be extremely caring about the ones he loves and is willing to do anything to protect them. Among the whole group, Alec is the most intelligent. For much of the series, Alec denies his homosexuality and attraction to males (particularly Jace & Magnus), which results in him lashing out at people. When he finally accepts himself, he becomes a more relaxed person and comes out as gay to the whole Clave and everyone there, including his family and parents, by publicly passionately kissing Magnus (in the TV show, he kisses Magnus at his arranged wedding to Lydia Branwell). Clary notes at the end of the fourth novel that Alec had become more generous with himself, allowing him to be more generous with others. Alec, as seen in City of Fallen Angels, can also become extremely jealous, getting angry at Magnus when he discovers Magnus' long dating history and relationship with Camille, a vampire woman. Although, in the TV show Alec is more accepting of Magnus' bisexuality.

Alec becomes a much more central character in City of Lost Souls and is one of the book's narrators. He, along with Clary, leads the search for Jace, while also dealing with Camille.

 Physical appearance
Alec is said to have a thin, wiry build and like his mother, has black hair, luminous blue eyes, and impressive height. He is also very pale. Alec is described as being very handsome as well, but unlike his sister, he tries to downplay his looks by wearing worn-out sweaters and damaged clothing. It is mentioned by Camille Belcourt that he bears a strong resemblance to William Herondale (Who Magnus Bane is also mentioned to have a crush on) from The Infernal Devices. In The Bane Chronicles Magnus Bane describes him as being the silver to Jace's gold. Magnus expresses the sentiment that, contrary to popular belief, silver is actually more rare than gold.

In the TV series, Alec is shown as having fluffy black hair, strong build, luminous hazel eyes, and an impressive height (6  ft 4in). He is also shown as looking from European/South American descent (Italian/Spanish). He is very handsome, but unlike Izzy, he is very subdued in the fashion department. He usually wears dark colors (sometimes grey/blue), sweaters, 99% of the time jeans, his black leather jacket, and usually his black combat boots. Alec looks to be in his early/mid-20s.

He was portrayed by Kevin Zegers in the film adaptation of the book and Matthew Daddario in the television series.

Family
Alec is the oldest child of the Lightwood family, and the first son of Maryse and Robert Lightwood. Isabelle and Max Lightwood are his younger siblings, and Jace is his adoptive brother and Parabatai.

Alec's love interests 
Jace Herondale: Alec is gay, and for the most part of the series, he remains convinced that he's always been in love with Jace. In City of Glass, however, Jace tells him that Alec thought he was in love with him because Jace was "safe," and an excuse not to take risks and try going out with someone else, namely, Magnus Bane. 
Magnus Bane: Alec's husband, a bisexual warlock. Magnus had always shown interest in Alec throughout the books, openly flirting with him upon meeting him in the first novel of the series and flirtatiously telling Alec to "call him" after winking at him. This eventually results in Alec starting a secret relationship with him by the end of the novel. After Jace's challenge, Alec kisses Magnus in front of all the Shadowhunters in front of the Clave when they were choosing partners for the battle in City of Glass, (however in the TV adaptation of the novels, Alec revealed this by kissing Magnus in the middle of Alec's arranged marriage with clave representative Lydia Branwell and revealed his association to him and his sexuality). Also, when Clary cast a Rune that made her look like the person the onlooker loved the most, it is implied that Alec saw Magnus. Later, his mother accepts the fact that he is gay (although his father does not completely come to terms with it) and in the book City of Fallen Angels, he and Magnus are on a vacation around the world, going to places like Paris, India, and other parts of Europe. They are called back when Magnus is needed to interrogate Camille. Alec is shocked at Magnus' long dating history and becomes worried about their future together because of Magnus' immortality and his mortality. He begins to speculate that the reason Magnus wanted the Book of White was to make Alec immortal, so they could stay together forever (although it is later revealed in the series that Magnus had actually wanted it so that he could take away his immortality and become mortal in order to be with Alec). He worries that Magnus will move on soon, and that he is just another lover for him in a long line. However, Magnus tells him he is not trivial, and that he isn't ready to lose Alec any time soon and can't imagine a future without him. They agree to wait and hope for the best. In City of Lost Souls, Alec is offered the power to shorten Magnus' lifespan by Camille, allowing them to grow old together. Alec doesn't reveal the offer to Magnus and briefly considers it. Despite the fact that he ultimately refuses Camille's offer, realizing he wouldn't be able to go through with it, Magnus breaks up with Alec because he did not share the fact that he'd been talking to Camille and considered shortening his life at all. Magnus confesses that while he still loves him, they are through as a couple. Magnus shares one final kiss with Alec before walking away from a tearful and heartbroken Alec. In the final novel, City of Heavenly Fire, Alec keeps calling Magnus after their tragic break up, but keeps hanging up whenever Magnus answers the call, resulting in Jace breaking his phone to get him to stop. A little later in the book, Alec and Magnus briefly speak and kiss when Magnus comes to say goodbye to Alec before the Lightwoods and the institute's Shadowhunters leave for Idris to be protected from Sebastian's attacks. Magnus later follows Alec to Idris as the warlocks' representative for the Clave's meetings; before he can speak to Alec, however, he is tricked into capture at a dinner hosted by the faeries. Alec, along with his friends, travel to Edom/hell to save Magnus and defeat Sebastian. By the end of the novel, after an emotional, tumultuous reunion in Edom, they are back together, for Magnus had time to think while broken up. Magnus presents a journal full of stories from his past that shaped who he is in present-day (later revealed to be The Bane Chronicles, the story collection was written by Clare and various co-writers to accompany Clare's novels); he wrote these stories for Alec during their time apart, when he learned that he cannot truly be in a loving relationship without sharing who he is. He asks Alec for another chance, and Alec agrees. At Jocelyn and Luke's wedding in the Epilogue, it is revealed that Alec and Magnus have come to peace with their immortality-mortality conflict, and are now living together in Magnus' Brooklyn loft. As of Lady Midnight, Magnus and Alec are engaged and have two sons - Max Lightwood-Bane, a blue-skinned warlock named after Alec's younger brother Max Lightwood, who was killed in the Mortal War, and Rafael Lightwood-Bane, an orphaned Shadowhunter named after Raphael Santiago.

Appearances in books 
City of Bones
City of Ashes
City of Glass
City of Fallen Angels
City of Lost Souls
City of Heavenly Fire
Lady Midnight
Lord of Shadows
Queen of Air and Darkness
Tales from the Shadowhunter Academy
The Bane Chronicles
A History of Notable Shadowhunters & Denizens of the Downworld
The Red Scrolls of Magic
Lost Book of White

Magnus Bane
Magnus Bane is the (former) High Warlock of Brooklyn. He regularly tampered with the mind of Clary Fray after designing a spell that would erase her memories of the Shadow World once every two years as a favour to her mother, Jocelyn. He first meets the other Shadowhunters at one of his Downworlder parties. He later has Clary retrieve the Book of the White for him in City of Glass, and agrees to help revive her mother with it. In City of Heavenly Fire, he admits to Alec that he is almost 400 years old, although he often lies about his age (for instance, in The Bane Chronicles he claims to be under 300 years old, to which his friends Catarina Loss and Ragnor Fell laugh, obviously aware of the lie, and in City of Glass he claims to be 800). Despite his flamboyant appearance and whimsical personality, Magnus is a kind yet jaded person who yearns for love and acceptance, but has great trouble revealing his honest desires and personal secrets to others due to his long and traumatic past. His life has frequently been entangled with the fates of certain Shadowhunters (specifically the Herondale family during the Victorian and Edwardian eras, and the Fairchild family following the collapse of Valentine's Circle), but he doesn't become seriously involved with the workings of their society and their struggle for survival and reformation until he meets Alec Lightwood, who goes on to become the absolute love of his life.

Physical appearance
Magnus Bane is described as being of Asian descent, due to his human parent being half-Dutch, half-Indonesian. He is an inch or two taller than Alec (although in the TV show Harry Shum Jr. is 5'11' while Matthew Daddario is 6'4') and is said to be lean, but not skinny, with lightly muscled arms. He has brown skin and black, nearly shoulder-length hair that is usually styled and dyed. He wears much makeup, such as glitter around his eyes and blue lipstick, and in City of Glass is also noted to own more makeup tools and accessories than even Isabelle Lightwood. He likes to flaunt his bisexuality by wearing flashy and sometimes bizarre clothing. Isabelle once described him as a "sexy, sexy warlock", whereas Simon Lewis countered that Magnus "looks like a gay Sonic the Hedgehog and dresses like the Child Catcher from Chitty Chitty Bang Bang." He also has gold-green eyes with vertical cat-like pupils and no belly button, both of which serve as his warlock marks. He is said to be about 19 years old, physically.

He is portrayed by Godfrey Gao in the film adaptation of the book, and Harry Shum Jr. in the television series by Freeform.

 Family
Magnus' mother and step-father began to fear him when he started nearing the age of ten, after they realised he wasn't fully human. It is revealed that his mother was in fact tricked into sleeping with a demon who disguised himself as her husband, and when she realized, sometime after Magnus' birth, that Magnus was a warlock (in other words, someone half-human, half-demon) and not her husband's child, she hanged herself in her family's barn in the novel while, (in the TV show, she slits her throat with a knife on her bed). Soon after, his step-father tried to drown him in the novel (but not in the TV show), and Magnus burned him alive in an attempt to save himself from his father. He was then brought up by the Silent Brothers of Madrid, who also came up with his name. Cassandra Clare revealed on Twitter that Magnus was born in what was once Batavia of the Dutch East Indies (modern-day Jakarta, Indonesia). Camille does state in City of Lost Souls that his biological father is a Prince of Hell, therefore implying he is a high-ranked demon. Whenever asked who his father is, Magnus always avoids the question or changes the subject. In City of Heavenly Fire, his father is revealed to be Asmodeus, the Greater Demon of Lust and ruler of Edom. Because Asmodeus is also a fallen angel, Magnus is capable of interacting with witchlights—he can make them glow red.

Love interests 
Alexander "Alec" Lightwood (boyfriend in City of Ashes, until their break up in City of Lost Souls; the two reconcile and get back together in City of Heavenly Fire): Magnus and Alec meet during one of Magnus' parties and Magnus openly flirts with him, eventually starting a secret relationship with him (since Alec was not ready to come out as gay yet) later on in the novel. The couple's relationship is revealed when Alec passionately kisses Magnus in front of the entire Clave right before a war is about to start in City of Glass (however in the TV show Alec kisses Magnus right in the middle of Alec's arranged marriage to Lydia Branwell after he called of the wedding). Alexander faces both public and private backlash (from the Clave and his father, respectively) because of this, but manages not to fully give in to his pain and frustration with some support from Magnus and Isabelle. However, the couple encounters trouble when they openly face the fact that Alec is mortal and is bound to age and die, whereas Magnus, who is immortal, will remain young forever. This, along with Magnus' extensive sexual history and constant unwillingness to share anything about himself with Alec, causes heavy complications in their relationship, since Alec begins to believe he is trivial to Magnus, while Magnus insists this is not the case, but refuses to explain himself or give proof. The two later break up during the epilogue of City of Lost Souls due to the fact that Alec had been visiting Camille Belcourt behind Magnus' back after Camille suggested to Alec that Magnus had sought the Book of the White to turn him mortal, and had offered to help Alec find the Book of the White in order to turn Magnus mortal. Alec briefly considers this but ultimately rejects it; however, Magnus does find this out and initially accepts Camille's "cover story" (that Alec wanted to un-immortalize him) as the truth. The two part with one final kiss before Magnus reluctantly walks away, leaving a heartbroken Alec behind. In The Infernal Devices we learn that Magnus has a thing for boys with dark hair and blue eyes, which matches Alec's physical appearance. In City of Heavenly Fire, Alec tries to apologize to Magnus and get back together with him but Magnus refuses to talk to him or answer his texts or calls. When all Shadowhunters are ordered to evacuate to Idris, Magnus goes to the institute to say goodbye to Alec and kisses him. Magnus makes it clear that he has forgiven Alec but cannot resume his relationship with him due to their vastly different personal circumstances. When Magnus is captured and sent to his father's hell-dimension, Edom, Alexander goes on a suicide mission to rescue him and miraculously succeeds, with help from his family and friends. The pair eventually get back together at the end of City of Heavenly Fire, with Alexander once again apologizing for his mistakes and Magnus promising to be more open with Alec about himself and their relationship. As of Lady Midnight, Magnus and Alec are engaged and have two sons—Max Lightwood-Bane, a blue-skinned warlock named for Alexander's deceased brother, Maxwell Lightwood, and Rafael Lightwood-Bane, an orphaned Argentinian Shadowhunter named for the vampire Raphael Santiago. Magnus has admitted that Alexander is the first and only Shadowhunter he has ever been in love with, as well as the only one of all his lovers with whom he has ever wanted to start a family. In Queen of Darkness, Alec and Magnus have wed, with all their family and friends surrounding them. (However, the plot-line is different in the TV show.)
Lady Camille Belcourt (The Infernal Devices) is perhaps the most prominent of Magnus' former lovers. Their relationship and history is one of Magnus' main plotlines in The Infernal Devices, having been lovers for many years before they eventually suffer a terrible misunderstanding that results in them severing ties. The two meet again approximately a century after Clockwork Prince in City of Fallen Angels, when Camille is captured and refuses to talk to anyone else but Magnus. This results in Magnus returning home, having been on a vacation with Alec at the time, and sees her for the first time in over a century. She attempts to make amends with Magnus, saying that he must have known they would see each other again due to their immortality, but Magnus remains bitter about her abrupt departure from his life. She begins to intentionally cause complications in his relationship with Alec by emotionally manipulating both him and Magnus, bringing up the topic of his immortality, and how since Alec was mortal, he would eventually die and leave Magnus behind. However, Magnus firmly states that while she "can give him the past, Alec is his future" and leaves. She then begins to meet with Alec in private in City of Lost Souls, since Alec seeks information about Magnus' past because the warlock himself refuses to tell him anything and actively hides important details about his life from him, which makes Alexander doubt his worth in Magnus' life. During a later meeting, Camille informs Alec that unless he wants to use dark magic or become a vampire, there is no way to make him immortal. She goes on to tell Alec, however, that if he really wants to be with Magnus forever, he would need to make Magnus a mortal, which she claims to be able to do. While Alec briefly considers it, he ultimately refuses, unwilling to shorten Magnus' life. Despite this, she tells him to meet her at an abandoned subway station one last time, to tell her his final decision. When Alec shows up at that meeting, ready to tell Camille he truthfully did not want to change Magnus, he instead finds Magnus there, who was told by Camille about the arrangement. He tells Alec that Camille told him everything about the two's private meetings, including that Alec was going to show up to accept her offer. He says he didn't want to believe Camille, but when Alec showed up, he could no longer disregard what she told him. This leads to the couple breaking up as a result of Camille's deception.
Woolsey Scott (The Infernal Devices). After leaving Camille, Magnus stayed with Woolsey for some time. Magnus and Woolsey are not so much a romantic relationship but one of circumstance and housing as well as physical satisfaction.
Imasu Morales (revealed in The Bane Chronicles: What Really Happened in Peru). Magnus met and fell in love with Imasu in 1890, when he visited the city of Puno, in Peru, with Catarina and Ragnor. As a result of their relationship, Magnus decided to learn how to play the musical instrument called charango, which he was terrible at. They had a rather short vacation romance. During the span of their relationship, Magnus never got around to telling Imasu about magic and his demonic origin. Magnus had even considered offering that he and Imasu live together, before Imasu broke up with him, since he felt that Magnus as a person was too ephemeral. Magnus laughed upon hearing this and told him that he was "the most permanent person" he would ever meet. They never spoke to each other again after that.
Etta (revealed in The Bane Chronicles: Saving Raphael Santiago). Magnus met Etta around 1938 at a club, where he asked her for a dance. By the end of the song, Etta claimed to have fallen for him, while he said had fallen for her before the song had even begun. The two started seeing each other, their relationship fairly serious, and Etta eventually learned what he really was — a warlock — and knew of the Shadow World. It also became a tradition for the couple to dance in his room late at night when Magnus was unable to join her and dance with her at her club. However, particularly by 1953, Etta slowly realized that she might want a family. When asked if she would want immortality, Etta said no, and insisted that while she would want more time with him, she is unwilling to stop time for herself to obtain that. Eventually, Etta did leave him. She did, however, remain a very well-remembered and cherished loved one of Magnus, and was the last person Magnus truly loved for over half a century, until Alec Lightwood.
Kitty (revealed in The Bane Chronicles: What Really Happened in Peru). Kitty was a mundane who had a fling with Magnus in 1962. Presumably Latina, Kitty met Magnus at Cuzco in Peru. Kitty was a con artist, and the couple went on a magical crime spree during the summer they were together.
Axel von Ferson (revealed in The Bane Chronicles: The Runaway Queen). Magnus met Axel in Paris in 1791 when the count first met him, hoping to utilize his magic to help the imperilled royal family escape the country. Magnus was instantly attracted to the man, who had his favorite physical combination—black hair and blue eyes. After rescuing the queen, Marie Antoinette, Axel and his men found them. While Axel said that his good deeds will be remembered, Magnus said that he only cared if he remembered. Then impulsively, Axel kissed him before departing. A few weeks later, Magnus, guilt stricken by the deaths of his loyal and kindhearted servants, received a letter from Axel's sister, who asked for his help to stop her brother from attempting to save the king and queen, who got caught. Magnus decided that mundane life was fleeting and chose not to involve himself any further.

Appearances in books 
City of Bones
City of Ashes
City of Glass
City of Fallen Angels
City of Lost Souls
City of Heavenly Fire
The Bane Chronicles
Tales from the Shadowhunter Academy
Clockwork Angel
Clockwork Prince
Clockwork Princess
Lady Midnight
Lord of Shadows
Queen of Air and Darkness
Ghosts of the Shadow market
A History of Notable Shadowhunters & Denizens of the Downworld
The Red Scrolls Of Magic

Maia Roberts
Maia Roberts is a biracial teenager born and raised in a New Jersey suburban neighborhood. Her brother, Daniel, was beautiful and abusive, though her parents never believed her, even when he broke her arm. This treatment leads to Maia hating and fearing beautiful boys, even after her brother was killed in a hit-and-run. In tenth-eleventh grade, Maia met Jordan Kyle and they began dating. However, during their relationship, he soon began to become controlling and abusive and she broke up with him. He became enraged at her break up with him and, in werewolf form, attacked her on her way home from a party. (She was a mundane and did not know that he was a werewolf or anything about the Shadow World.) Jordan vanished shortly afterward, and Maia soon turned into a werewolf on the next full moon. She ran away from home and joined the wolf-pack in New York and became good friends with Luke, the leader of the pack. She became associated with the Shadowhunters and develops a crush on Simon, and in City of Glass gets into a competition with Isabelle for his attention.

In City of Ashes, Maia leaves Luke's apartment to apologize to Simon for her vicious reaction (after she was attacked) and realized he was a vampire. On her way over to him, she is attacked by Agramon, the Demon of Fear which she interprets as her older brother Daniel who violently abused her when he was still alive. Valentine then abducts her to drain her completely of blood so he can complete his spell. Simon is kidnapped as well shortly after for his vampire blood. It is learned that lycanthropes are negatively affected by silver when Valentine sprinkles silver dust on her and she screams in pain.

At the beginning of City of Fallen Angels, Maia and Simon are casually dating, while Simon, not to her or Isabelle's knowledge, ends up also casually dating Isabelle. The truth of Simon's actions comes out just as Maia runs into her ex-boyfriend Jordan Kyle. Jordan, who had recently become acquainted with Simon, was the one who turned Maia into a werewolf. However, Jordan's actions were not what they seemed to be, as he had just become a new werewolf when he bit her and therefore unable to control his actions. Maia is understandably angry to have him back in her life due to his abusiveness during their relationship and him turning her into a werewolf, but when she learns the truth behind what Jordan did, she understands and even seems to forgive him when realizing he is genuinely regretful of his past actions towards her. Towards the end of the book, after she and Jordan have helped Isabelle and Alec look for Simon, she and Jordan kiss and eventually reaffirm their relationship.

Physical appearance
Maia is described as having curly, brown and gold hair (her eyelashes are described as the color of toast), light brown skin and amber-brown eyes. She is also described as having a heart-shaped face and rather curvy figure when Clary notes, "No girl should have that great of a body."

She is portrayed by Alisha Wainwright in the television series.

Family
Not much is said about Maia's mother or father, however her older brother Daniel is mentioned. Daniel was said to be an attractive boy, but a very abusive brother to Maia, It is said that he gave her bruises where they wouldn't be seen, breaking her arm, etc. He died when he was hit by a car while at a young age, but Maia still felt afraid of him for many more years after.

Maia's love interests 
Jordan Kyle: Maia is dating him as of City of Lost Souls. They had dated back in high school, but when Jordan was turned into a werewolf he would, in result of the side effects on his body, constantly yell at her and became abusive towards her often slapping and hitting her, unaware of what he was doing to her. Not knowing the cause of his sudden abusiveness, she broke it off with him, even kissing another guy to prove this to him. Angered by this and it being the first full moon since he had been bit, Jordan turned into a werewolf for the first time and attacked and bit her during his angered emotions, which were much stronger due to the full moon, as she left a party. Maia was never able to forgive him for what he did to her until she met him again in City of Fallen Angels after he had been to rehab; truly regretful of his actions towards her and how he had treated her in the past and still very much in love with her. Jordan even felt that he did not deserve a second chance with her on account of how badly he had treated her, feeling unworthy of her and that she deserved better than him. The two, however, slowly begin to grow back together over time, eventually resulting in sharing several kisses (and leading them to eventually sleep together on several different occasions) and soon reaffirming their relationship on a clean slate. In City of Heavenly Fire, he was murdered by Jonathan "Sebastian" Morgernstern.
Simon Lewis: Maia had a crush on Simon upon meeting him and soon began to date him, though never seriously and more as a fling. She broke up with him when she found out that he was also seeing Isabelle, although Simon didn't think things were serious between him and Maia as things never became exclusive. This in which Maia eventually agrees on, saying it wasn't "technically cheating" since she and Simon never made their relationship official. The two eventually mend their friendship back together and remain good friends.
Bat Velasquez: Maia had dated him for a some time after she became a werewolf. Bat was also a part of Luke's pack. When Maia decides that she still needed space and wasn't ready for a new relationship after her recent break up with Jordan Kyle, he accepts this and dates a witch. It was mentioned in City of Heavenly Fire that he really didn't like the witch. It was also shown in the ending of City of Heavenly Fire that when Bat and Maia were walking along the side of the lake in Luke's farm that Bat held Maia's hand which Maia didn't seem to mind.

Appearances 
City of Ashes
City of Glass
City of Fallen Angels
City of Lost Souls
City of Heavenly Fire
A History of Notable Shadowhunters & Denizens of the Downworld

Jocelyn Fairchild/Morgenstern
 
Jocelyn Morgenstern/Fairchild/Fray/Garroway/Graymark is Clary's mother and a former Shadowhunter. Jocelyn grew up in Idris with Luke, Valentine, and the other Circle members. She was married to Valentine at the age of 19, though she says she married him because she loved him, she later realized that he was torturing innocent people. She fled Idris when she found out she was pregnant with Clary, so he could not do harm to her daughter like he did on Jonathan (Sebastian), her first-born son. Later it is said that Luke tracked her down and Clary, being around the age of 3–5 at the time though it does not specify, opened the door to him. He then stayed in their lives and he and Jocelyn lived their lives in New York, also taking a large part in raising Clary, until Jocelyn is located by Valentine. She takes a potion, putting herself in a coma to protect her secrets and remains unconscious until she is revived by Magnus Bane in City of Glass. She is also a Shadowhunter warrior.

In City of Glass, after Valentine was killed by the angel Raziel, Lucian Graymark (Luke) finally declared his love for her, telling her he's been in love with her for over 20 years. After he walks out the door, initially believing she did not return his feelings, she soon runs after him to tell she loves him too. It is then later revealed in City of Fallen Angels that they are engaged to be married and also are "disgustingly in love" as described by Clary. Later in City of Lost Souls, after Luke is wounded by Sebastian and in critical condition, Jocelyn says to him how she regrets failing to have noticed his feelings for her back when they were younger and wishes he would have told her how he felt about her so she would have married "the right guy" instead of Valentine. Hence things would have been "different" and could have turned out better than they were currently. However, Luke doesn't have any regrets saying how if things had been any different, "they" wouldn't have Clary, making Jocelyn happy since he said "as though he was sure Clary was his own daughter".

Physical appearance 
Jocelyn is described of being elegant and beautiful. She has long red hair that is usually in a twist, and still carries the scars of her Shadowhunting days. Clary is often said to look almost identical to her. Jocelyn's hair is also a darker red than Clary's.

She is portrayed by Lena Headey in the film adaptation of the book and Maxim Roy in the television series.

Family 
Jocelyn has two children, Jonathan Christopher and Clarissa Adele. Her parents were killed in a fire set by Valentine Morgenstern, in which she also believed that Jonathan had been killed. She is engaged to Lucian Graymark (Luke) as of City of Lost Souls, and they were married in City of Heavenly Fire, with the majority of the epilogue taking place at the wedding reception.

Children 
Clary Fray (Fairchild): Clary is Jocelyn's daughter whom she loves very dearly and takes care of as well as she can, with the help of Luke.
 Sebastian/Jonathan Christopher Morgenstern: After the cruelty in him was murdered by Clary, he became the son Jocelyn was hoping for, causing her to love him, but he didn't last long, for the good in him was not abundant enough for him to survive; but it was enough time for him to apologize for Valentine's doing that made him the person that he was.

Love interests 
 Valentine Morgenstern: (ex-husband) Valentine used to be very nice to other shadowhunters and would take them under his wing. But, later the followers would figure out that Valentine did this to build a group to rid the world of downworlders. Before Jocelyn knew this plan, she married Valentine, being the only one who could cheer him up on bad days. Valentine was abusive and a psychopath. Although they had a son and a daughter together, one of the results was not what she looked for.
 Luke Garroway/Lucian Graymark: (love interest-fiancé) Ever since Jocelyn and Luke met, they have been close and then Valentine came along and ruined Luke's chances. When Valentine disappeared, Luke had his chances again. He met up with Jocelyn and helped with Clary and helped Clary grow up. Finally, Luke admits his feelings to Jocelyn and is happy with his new wife (Jocelyn).

Appearances in books 
 City of Bones
 City of Ashes (mentioned)
 City of Glass
 City of Fallen Angels
 City of Lost Souls
 City of Heavenly Fire
A History of Notable Shadowhunters & Denizens of the Downworld

Valentine Morgenstern
Valentine Morgenstern is the main antagonist of the first half of the series, and is the former husband of Jocelyn Fairchild. This also makes him biological father to Clarissa Morgenstern and Jonathan Christopher Morgenstern (also known as Sebastian).  In his youth he was a very skilled Shadowhunter from a rich family in Alicante.  His best friend was Lucian Graymark while they were in school, among other Shadowhunters including Maryse Lightwood (née Trueblood), Robert Lightwood, Hodge Starkweather, Stephen Herondale and Michael Wayland.  Upon the death of his father, Valentine fell in love with Jocelyn Fairchild, and together he and his group of young Shadowhunters formed the infamous group known as the Circle.  With him leading the Circle, they had intended to share the gift of the Nephilim with the rest of humanity by using the Mortal Cup.  Valentine and Jocelyn married and all was well until his ideas for the Circle became more radical, as Valentine wanted to kill all Downworlders.  He infects his son with Demon blood and is betrayed by his former best friend, Lucian Graymark, and his wife at the Uprising of the Accords.  Upon fleeing the battle, Valentine is assumed to be dead and goes into hiding with his son and Jace Herondale.

Years later, when City of Bones begins, Valentine finds Jocelyn and wants her to reveal where the Mortal Cup is located.  He kidnaps her, but is unable to extract information from her due to her self-induced comatose state. He eventually secures the Mortal Cup, and the Mortal Sword and goes to the Mortal Mirror to summon the Angel Raziel. His arrogance, however, as well as his torturing of the angel Ithuriel, Raziel's brother, causes the angel to slay him. During the series, it is also revealed he faked his death and took on the name of Michael Wayland, raising Jace Herondale as Jace Wayland.

Physical appearance
Valentine is said to be tall and very handsome.  He is broad-shouldered and has light blond, almost silver hair. He also has black eyes. Though in the movie he has dark brown hair and blue eyes.

He is portrayed by Jonathan Rhys Meyers in the film adaptation of the book and Alan van Sprang in the television series.

Family
Valentine is the former husband of Jocelyn Fairchild, with whom he had two children (Clarissa "Clary" Adele Morgenstern and Jonathan Christopher Morgenstern).  Clarissa realizes that she is Valentine's daughter in the first book, City of Bones, but being raised by Jocelyn her whole life is void of Valentine's influence.  His son however, was tutored by him to be a very talented Shadowhunter and ruthless killer.  He later becomes Valentine's spy, taking the name Sebastian Verlac.  Valentine also adopts Jace Herondale as his son, training him as well as Jonathan, making him as skilled a Shadowhunter as Jonathan.

Valentine also experimented on his children. Hoping to make a stronger and better Shadowhunter, he infused Jonathan with demon blood while in Jocelyn's womb. However, a side effect of the blood was that it would "burn out his [Jonathan's] humanity as poison burns the life from blood."  This gave him a son capable of incredible feats, but with little to no compassion or ability to love. The experimentation on Jonathan led to Jocelyn feeling sick and very depressed. To make her feel better he gave her powdered Angel blood, not knowing that she was carrying a second child (Clary), infusing Clary with Angel blood in the same way that Jonathan was with Demon blood.  With Jace, upon the failure of Jonathan to show any compassion, he gave Angel blood to Jace's mother (Celiné Herondale), hoping to create a stronger warrior, without the side effects Jonathan suffered from the use Demon blood. In the end, Valentine trained Jace, but was forced to abandon him when he was 10 years old, making Valentine the only father Jace has known. It is also thought that of the two boys, the angel and the demon, that Valentine loved Jace more than his own son.

Valentine's Love Interests 
Jocelyn Fairchild/Fray/Morgenstern/Graymark/Garroway:
Lucian Graymark: When Valentine and Lucian (Luke) were once parabatai, they shared a brotherly love. Though no longer parabatai, they hate each other to the ends of the earth.

Appearances in books 
City of Bones
City of Ashes
City of Glass
City of Lost Souls
City of Fallen Angels (mentioned)
City of Heavenly Fire (mentioned)
A History of Notable Shadowhunters & Denizens of the Downworld

Jonathan Morgenstern
Sebastian Verlac/Jonathan Christopher Morgenstern/Sebastian Morgenstern is the son of Valentine Morgenstern and Jocelyn Fairchild, and brother of Clary Fray.  His real name is Jonathan Christopher Morgenstern, but he went by Sebastian Verlac (cousin of the Penhallows) in City of Glass.  He is very sadistic in nature, as a result of having been experimented on with the blood of the Greater Demon Lilith, which robbed him of his humanity.  He first appears in City of Glass as Sebastian Verlac, charming his way into the lives of the Lightwoods.  He takes Clary to see Ragnor Fell, and kisses her, disgusting her.  Upon Clary's return with Jace to Alicante, it is discovered that Max Lightwood had seen someone climbing the demon warding towers.  Sebastian was the person climbing the towers, and it was his blood that was used to bring down the wards.  During the first attack on Alicante, he also kills Max Lightwood and severely injures Isabelle Lightwood.  He is eventually tracked down and killed by Jace, before the summoning of Raziel by Valentine, but his body is never recovered.  He is taken by his "mother", Lilith, and taken to safety.  She uses Jace as leverage and tries to bring him back from the dead.  In City of Fallen Angels he is awoken, and uses a rune put on Jace to control him.

He becomes the main antagonist in City of Lost Souls, using Lilith's bond to alter Jace's memories to believe they are on the same side and plans on raising and army of demons and Dark Shadowhunters to destroy the world. Clary infiltrates his inner circle through Jace and they both continually mistrust each other but are forced to work together when they are attacked by enemy demons. Eventually Clary learns the truth of his plans and they engage in a bloody battle. Unable to kill him because it will kill Jace too, she gives up but successfully destroys their base of operations with one of her runes. After a dark ritual, he uses the Infernal Cup to create more Dark Shadowhunters and almost turns Clary but is quickly stopped by the arrival of the Lightwoods and their allies. Before he manages to escape, Clary is forced to stab Jace with the angelic sword Glorious, severing his bond with Sebastian and causing the latter horrible pain. At the end of the book he sends a message to Maryse Lightwood: severed angel wings with a single,piece of paper saying ´´I am coming.´´

In City of Heavenly Fire, Sebastian is attacking institutes around the world and turning Shadowhunters into Endarkened. He then goes and attacks the Citadel, and kills many Shadowhunters but is forced to flee when Jace loses control of his Heavenly Fire. Sebastian then later visits Clary and tries to convince her to leave with him, offering her mercy but she refuses. Once again Jace and Sebastian fight but Sebastian proves that he cannot be hurt by anything other than the Heavenly Fire after he stabs himself and then leaves unharmed. 
Sebastian offers to leave all of the Shadowhunters in Alicante alone, and return Jocelyn, Luke, Magnus, Raphael and Meliorn, whom he has kidnapped,  if the Clave turn over Clary and Jace to him. Clary, Jace, Simon, Alec and Isabelle all travel by portal to the Seelie court and travel through to Edom, where Sebastian is hiding. Sebastian is well aware of this and plans for them. When they arrive Sebastian defeats them all and forces Clary by his side. When he is unaware, Clary stabs him with a sword that contains the Heavenly Fire, burning away all of the demon blood in him. He dies surrounded by Clary, Jocelyn and Jace. Clary mourns for the brother that she could have had. 
Clary later spreads Sebastian's ashes over Lake Lyn.

Physical appearance
He is said to be the spitting image of Valentine.  He has naturally white/silver hair, is very buff, and has deep black eyes.  He dyes his hair black in City of Glass while he is impersonating Sebastian Verlac.

He is portrayed by Will Tudor as Sebastian and Luke Baines in his true form in the television series.

Family
Jonathan is the birth child of Jocelyn Morgenstern (née Fairchild) and Valentine Morgenstern.  He was experimented on by Valentine while Jocelyn was pregnant with him. When he was born, Jocelyn knew that something was wrong with the child and had to try very hard to be around him.  He is Clary's brother, and has an unusual sexual attraction to her, freely kissing her in City of Glass and almost forcing himself on her in City of Lost Souls with Clary having to fight him off, repulsed by his actions. The Demoness Lilith also claims that Jonathan is her "son" due to the fact that it is her demon blood that flows through his veins.

Love interests 
Clary Fray/Morgenstern/Fairchild: It is revealed in City of Glass that Sebastian/ Jonathan has an interest in Clary. Though Clary tries to push him away, he does not leave her alone. In City of Lost Souls Sebastian tries to rape Clary, and she almost kills him because of it, but does not because of the bond he and Jace Herondale shared at the time. 
The Seelie Queen: In City of Heavenly Fire Sebastian and the Seelie Queen become a pair for war purposes. The Seelie Court was helping Sebastian, so he hooked up with the Seelie Queen in hopes of getting closer to her. He marries her eventually, and she gave birth to a baby boy, Ash Morgenstern. He briefly appears in The Dark Artifices  Lord of Shadows and  Queen of Air and Darkness.

Appearances in books 
City of Bones (mentioned)
City of Ashes (mentioned)
City of Glass
City of Fallen Angels
City of Lost Souls
City of Heavenly Fire
Tales from the Shadowhunter Academy (mentioned)
A History of Notable Shadowhunters & Denizens of the Downworld
Lady Midnight (mentioned) 
Queen of Air and Darkness

Secondary characters

Alaric
Alaric was a werewolf and served as Third hand (soon second when Gretel died) to Luke in his werewolf pack. He later dies in the battle at Renwick's in City of Bones.

Amatis Graymark
Amatis Graymark is Luke's sister who resides in Alicante. She cared for Luke after their mother became an Iron Sister, married Stephen Herondale, and later joined Valentine's Circle. However, when Luke was bitten by a werewolf, Amatis sent him away in disgust, in spite of their close relationship. Even after this, Valentine decided that Amatis was unfit to be Stephen's wife for having a Downworlder brother, and told Stephen to leave Amatis for Céline Montclaire (Jace's biological mother), devastating Amatis. Amatis later became regretful of her decision to banish her brother, who became distrustful of her. In City of Glass, Luke took refuge in Amatis' residence due to Clary's wounds caused by Lake Lyn, despite Amatis' resistance. Amatis then helps the Shadowhunters in the battle of Brocelind Plain and mends her relationship with Luke afterwards. In City of Lost Souls, Jonathan Morgenstern kidnaps Amatis and turns her into an Endarkened Shadowhunter by having her drink from the Infernal Cup, becoming Jonathan's faithful lieutenant from then on. With the Infernal Cup's destruction at the end of the series, Amatis too dies along with all other Endarkened Shadowhunters, only managing to give Luke one last loving look.

Catarina Loss
Catarina Loss is a warlock and an old friend of Magnus Bane, Ragnor Fell, and Tessa Gray. She has blue skin which she covers up using glamour rather frequently due to her choice to work at Beth Israel Hospital, a hospital for the mundanes. She helps Magnus craft an antidote to wake Jocelyn from her coma and is entrusted with the Book of the White. Catarina continues to help the Shadowhunters against Jonathan and his army of Endarkened Shadowhunters and at the end of the series, attends Jocelyn and Luke's wedding, where she hints that the Fair Folk is possibly planning revenge against the Shadowhunters for the disadvantaging terms applied to them for their betrayal during the war. She also begins teaching history at the Shadowhunter Academy in Alicante.

In the television series, she is portrayed by Sophia Walker.

Emma Carstairs 
Emma Carstairs is a young Shadowhunter of the Los Angeles Institute who appears in City of Heavenly Fire. She is also the main protagonist of The Dark Artifices series (which takes place five years after The Mortal Instruments). Her parents are both killed by Malcolm Fade — although it was unknown at the time — during the height of the war against Jonathan and his army of Endarkened Shadowhunters; though they are not the true suspects, the Clave decides to put the blame on them. Emma is also interrogated by the Clave using the Mortal Sword which impacts her greatly and prompts Clary to comfort her. Though the Clave mumbles on sending Emma to her relatives, Emma decides to live with her parabatai, Julian Blackthorn, and his family back in Los Angeles. She has a crush on Jace Herondale, which later turns into a fierce desire to be like him, the best Shadowhunter of her generation.

Hodge Starkweather
Hodge Starkweather was a member of the Circle, a tutor to the Lightwood children. He was bound to the New York Institute due to not leaving the Circle before the Uprising but was still loyal to Valentine and tricked Clary into giving him The Mortal Cup so he could give to Valentine in order to be freed of his curse. He fled afterwards with Clary in pursuit and cornered him. Hodge was about to kill her but was attacked by Luke in his werewolf form and somehow found the strength to escape. He reappears again in City of Glass where he was imprisoned by the Clave in the cell next to the one Simon Lewis was in. After Simon was rescued by Clary, Jace and Alec, Hodge revealed where the Mortal Mirror was and nearly revealed to Jace that Valentine wasn't his real father but was killed by Jonathan Morgenstern before he could.

He is played by Jared Harris in the movie and Jon Cor in the television series.

Imogen Herondale
Imogen Herondale (née Whitelaw) is the Inquisitor up to City of Ashes and the paternal grandmother of Jace Herondale. Ever since Stephen's death at the hands of Valentine and her husband's immediate death after hearing the news, Imogen becomes a cold-hearted woman who seeks vengeance against Valentine and anyone who has connections with him, such as the former members of his Circle which includes the Lightwoods. She is also certain that Jace, whom she believes is Valentine's son, is a spy of his father. In City of Ashes, though, Imogen realizes that Jace is actually her grandson after looking at his birthmark (a sign of the Herondales which every Herondale man inherited, starting from Will) and sacrifices herself to protect Jace from a poison attack. Before she dies, Imogen tells Jace how his real father, Stephen, would be proud of him if he were still alive. She is portrayed by Mimi Kuzyk in the television series.

Lilith
Lilith is a Greater Demon, the first woman made by God and is said to have been Adam's first wife. However, she was disobedient so she was cast into Hell. Also Sebastian/Jonathan's creator because it was her blood that Valentine used. In the book, City of Fallen Angels, it is said that Lilith considers Sebastian her son because it is her blood that flows through his veins.
She is then killed on Earth and banished to Edom by attacking Simon when he still had the Mark of Cain. She is portrayed by Anna Hopkins and Tara Westwood in the television series.

Consul Malachi
Malachi was a Shadowhunter Consul for almost two decades before his death. He secretly worked with Valentine Morgenstern and planned to destroy all of the Clave. Consequently, he was an enemy. He is killed in City of Glass by Hugo after he tries to hurt Clary.

Maryse Lightwood
Maryse Lightwood (née Trueblood) is the ex-wife of Robert Lightwood, mother of Alec, Isabelle, and Max, and the adoptive mother of Jace Herondale, being the one who gave him his nickname that he preferred over his "real" name, Jonathan. She is also one of the heads of the New York Institute. Maryse had a brother who decided to leave the Shadowhunter world in favor of marrying a mundane, making her an outcast in her peers, though she still honored him by naming her youngest son, Max, after him. Like her husband, Maryse was a part of Valentine's Circle and was the more attracted of the two, up until the Uprising which sentenced her and Robert to lead the New York Institute as punishment for conspiring with Valentine. Her marriage with Robert is never the same ever since the Uprising, with Robert even thinking of leaving the family several times. Maryse becomes especially grief-stricken after Max's death at the hands of Sebastian in City of Glass. At the end of The Mortal Instruments series, Maryse and Robert announce that they are no longer together, though the two say that they will continue to care and love each other. She is portrayed by Nicola Correia Damude in the television series.

Maureen Brown
Maureen Brown is a 14-year-old girl who tells everyone she is Simon's girlfriend and is the friend of the cousin of Simon's friend Eric. In City of Fallen Angels, Simon drinks her blood, but Camille turns her into a vampire and she starts working for Lilith after killing multiple mundanes. In the epilogue of City of Lost Souls, Alec goes to kill Camille though discovers that Maureen has already killed her and is now head of the New York vampire clan.

Maureen, as leader of the clan, allowed the members to kill conspicuously while sending for some of them to capture Simon, who later escaped to Idris with Raphael. It appears she was mentally tormented by Lilith and Camille before turning into a vampire which resulted in her corrupted state. Eventually Lily Chen, one of the second-in-commands of the clan, conspired with Maia Roberts, the new leader of the New York werewolf pack, to kill Maureen to stop her reckless actions; while most of the members were happy with her, some saw the error of her ways as a problem to their kind. Maia agreed to join Maureen's cause against the Shadowhunters to make her drink her blood and seal the deal. Her blood, however, was spiked with holy water and Maureen turned to dust, but not before being able mutter her last word, "Mama". Lily then took leadership of the clan.

Max Lightwood
Maxwell "Max" Joseph Lightwood is the second son of Robert and Maryse and the younger brother of Alec and Isabelle. He is 9 years old and is described as hating the fact that he is still young, which prevents him from joining in the matters for adults. In City of Glass, Max is murdered by Sebastian, who strikes him with his hammer. His death greatly impacts his sister, who blames herself for not being there to save him. His older brother, Alec Lightwood, later names his adopted warlock son, Max Michael Lightwood-Bane, after him. He's portrayed by Jack Fulton in the television series.

Raphael Santiago
Raphael Santiago used to be the head of the New York vampire clan at the Hotel Dumort. He became a vampire sometime in the 1950s after being bitten by a vampire at the hotel when he tried to drive out the vampires who lived there. He is said to have been asexual. He also briefly dated Shadowhunter Isabelle Lightwood in the TV adaptation of the book series. He was murdered by Sebastian Morgenstern for not killing Magnus Bane in the last installment of The Mortal Instruments: City Of Heavenly Fire. In the television series, Raphael did not die but was instead involuntarily dosed with heavenly fire which returned him to being human and was studying to become a priest. He is portrayed by David Castro in the television series.

Robert Lightwood
Robert Lightwood is one of the heads of the New York Institute, later the Inquisitor, ex-husband of Maryse, father of Alec, Isabelle, and Max, as well as the adoptive father of Jace Herondale. He was a part of Valentine's Circle until the Uprising, after which he and his family were banished to New York. His parabatai was Michael Wayland, but they drifted apart because of Robert's contempt for the latter's love for him, later breaking up completely after Robert's banishment to the point that Robert did not know that Michael had been murdered with his identity being taken up by Valentine. Robert's marriage with Maryse has been strained since their banishment and Robert once even considered to leave the family for Annamarie Highsmith if not for Max's birth; this fact is played up by Isabelle after Max's death, who accuses her father of being happy with Max's death now that his "burden" is released. Robert also seems to be the one in his family least pleased when Alec comes out of the closet, even questioning him about what drove him to become gay. At the end of The Mortal Instruments series, Robert has ended his marriage with Maryse, though the two say that they will continue to love each other. He also tells Alec that his disapproval of the latter's sexuality was because of his own guilt and shame from his unfair treatment of Michael Wayland. In the television series, he's portrayed by Paulino Nunes.

Tessa Gray/Herondale/Carstairs
Theresa "Tessa" Gray is a half-demon half-Shadowhunter warlock who is descended from the Starkweather family and the ancestor of the Herondale family. She is the main protagonist of The Infernal Devices series, a distant prequel series of The Mortal Instruments series set during the Victorian era London. Though she does not appear until the last book, Tessa figures prominently in the series' backstory, not only by her descendants (one of whom is Jace Herondale) but also as the one who performed the Shadowhunter ritual on Clary when she was younger; Clary even notes several times before their formal meeting that Tessa is familiar to her in some way. She was married to Will Herondale until his mortal death 60 years post-marriage, after which Tessa became a recluse living in the Spiral Labyrinth. When Brother Zachariah is cured by Jace's heavenly fire, he reverts to Tessa's old lover, Jem Carstairs, now a mortal and dispelled of any needs of his yin fen medication to which he had needed to live. The two happily marry sometime after Jocelyn and Luke's wedding, attended by the ghosts of Will Herondale and Jessamine Lovelace.

Brother Zachariah/Jem Carstairs 
Zachariah is a Silent Brother who becomes the one most contacted by the Clave to solve cases regarding the New York Institute in 2007 after the Silent Brothers' massacre by Valentine. He used to be Jem Carstairs, a main character of The Infernal Devices series, who was turned into a Silent Brother to save his life as he laid dying due to running out of the yin fen medication required to sustain his life, in the process breaking his parabatai link with Will Herondale and separating him from his fiancée, Tessa Gray. He and Tessa together performed the Shadowhunter protection ritual on Clary when she was younger, thus erasing her knowledge about the Shadow World for a time. When he finds out that Jace is a descendant of Will, Zachariah becomes fiercely protective of him, especially when he is put under Jonathan Morgenstern's spell and infused with the heavenly fire. In City of Heavenly Fire, Zachariah's attempt to save Jace infuses him with the heavenly fire, which burns out his yin fen and turns him back into a mortal Jem Carstairs again. During the war he finds Emma Carstairs, a descendant of his family and protects her during the war. After the war, Jem reunites with Tessa and marries her a year after Jocelyn and Luke's wedding. He also begins to keep an eye on his distant relative, Emma Carstairs, and Tessa's descendants, the Blackthorns, in Los Angeles, and Jace Herondale.

See also
City of Bones
City of Ashes
City of Glass
City of Fallen Angels
City of Lost Souls
City of Heavenly Fire

References 

Mortal Instruments